The Ties That Bind (1993, literally translated as The Link) is the only complete novel by the French author Vanessa Duriès.

The novel tells the story of Laika, a young student, who is initiated to BDSM and then her evolution as a slave, and also of her growing love relationship with her master, Pierre. It also provides some insight into the devastating effects of the revelation of her sexual orientation on her relationship with her parents.  The story is allegedly autobiographical.

Publication history
 Le lien (in French) - Editions J'ai lu - 
 The Ties That Bind (translated from the French) - Masquerade Books -

References

1993 French novels
BDSM literature
French erotic novels
French autobiographical novels
1993 debut novels